The men's pole vault event at the 1990 World Junior Championships in Athletics was held in Plovdiv, Bulgaria, at Deveti Septemvri Stadium on 8 and 9 August.

Medalists

Results

Final
9 August

Qualifications
8 Aug

Group A

Participation
According to an unofficial count, 23 athletes from 16 countries participated in the event.

References

Pole vault
Pole vault at the World Athletics U20 Championships